Gerhard Deutsch was a German swimmer. In 1931 he won the 100 m backstroke event at the national and European championships.

References

Male backstroke swimmers
German male swimmers